Orou Igbo Akambi is the king of Toui, in central Benin.

References

21st-century Beninese people
Beninese Ahmadis